The 1992–93 Slovenian Second League season started on 23 August 1992 and ended on 20 June 1993. Each team played a total of 30 matches.

League standing

See also
1992–93 Slovenian PrvaLiga
1992–93 Slovenian Third League

External links
Football Association of Slovenia 

Slovenian Second League seasons
2
Slovenia